Denys Volk-Karachevsky is a Ukrainian retired footballer.

Career
Denys Volk-Karachevsky started playing in professional clubs in early 1997 in the second league team Dynamo with Sack. At the beginning of the 1997–1998 season, the footballer received an invitation to the team of the top Ukrainian league Tavriya Simferopol with Simferopol. Volk-Karachevsky played for the team for a year and a half, during which he played 9 matches of the Ukrainian championship and 1 match in Cup of Ukraine. In early 1999, the footballer briefly returned to his hometown, where he played for the amateur team "Chernomorets". In the 1999–2000 season, Denis Volk-Karachevsky began playing in the amateur team "Falcon" from Zolocheva. The team started the next season in the second league, and according to the results of the 2001–2002 season, it won a ticket to the first league. Volk-Karachevsky spent one season in the first league as a member of the Sokil Zolochiv team. for which he played 18 matches. and he played another match as part of the second league farm club Sokil Zolochiv. In the 2003–2004 season, the footballer played in the second league team Elektrometalurh-NZF, and in the 2004–2005 season as part of another second-league team "Crimean Greenhouse". In the second half of 2005, Volk-Karachevsky played in the second league team Oleksandriya, and spent 2006 as part of the second league team "Energy" with South Ukrainian. In 2007, Denis Volk-Karachevsky played in another team of the second league "Miner" with Krivoy Rog. In the future, the player played only in amateur teams, the most famous of which are Mir (Gornostayivka), Crystal (Kherson) and Elektrometalurh-NZF. Since 2012, the footballer played for the second time in his career in an amateur team from his hometown "Chernomorets".

References

External links 
 Denys Volk-Karachevsky footballfacts.ru
 Denys Volk-Karachevsky allplayers.in.ua

1979 births
Living people
FC Desna Chernihiv players
Ukrainian footballers
Ukrainian Premier League players
Ukrainian First League players
Ukrainian Second League players
Ukrainian expatriate sportspeople in Kazakhstan
Expatriate footballers in Kazakhstan
Association football defenders